A jenglot (Indonesian ) is a small creature of Indonesian culture and mythology. They have long hair which grows sparse and stiff through the legs, and long nails. The doll itself does nothing, but when imbued with black magic, is said to provide protection to its master, takes revenge on an enemy or works as a good luck charm. It can fetch thousands of ringgit when sold.

Folklore states that they were formerly human beings. Jenglot 'keepers' feed their creature with blood, either animal blood (goat) or human blood. The blood is placed near the jenglot, which is said not to drink the blood directly. According to traditional belief, the jenglot will get the nutrients of the blood in their own way.

Exhibition
In Indonesia there has been several "exhibitions" of jenglot specimens found and showcased. Most being found on the islands of Java and Sumatra, and are held as private collections of supernatural researchers and fans. People who have caught the jenglot usually bring their creature all over Indonesia to exhibit them in order to gain some money. They have also been shown at "Pameran Misteri, Jin, Hantu dan Keranda" at Sultan Alam Shah Museum, Shah Alam. Others still maintain that they are no more than "man-made toys [with] no supernatural power."

Hoax 
Many were found to be hoaxes, being masterful taxidermist fixings of monkeys and fish, however, not all specimens were examined, and the jenglot is an actively believed myth that many natives believe to be real. In 2008, scientists in Malaysia examined hairs and DNA from four jengelots brought from Irian Jaya, Indonesia to Kuala Lumpur, Malaysia by a 'businessman' to be exhibited in a local museum. Each of the samples appeared to be from humans and DNA analysis showed it was likely from the same person. They even noted that "A few hairs from samples [...] also had an intact dried root at the other end of the cut tip, which indicated that the hairs were implanted upside down on the Jenglots’ heads".

See also
 Jenny Haniver
 Pontianak
 Toyol

References

External links
 Jenglot, "Monster Kecil" yang Misterius (in Indonesian Language) 
 Jenglot Jive – Tiny Entities Discovered In Southeast Asia 

Indonesian legendary creatures
Mythological hematophages